The 2020 Swedish Athletics Championships was the 125th national outdoor track and field championships for Sweden. It was held from 14–16 August in Uppsala and organised by Upsala IF.

Championships
Swedish outdoor championships took place at several venues beyond the main track and field championships.

Results

Men

Women

References

Results

External links
 Swedish Athletics Federation website

Swedish Athletics Championships
Swedish Athletics Championships
Swedish Athletics Championships
Swedish Athletics Championships
Sports competitions in Uppsala